The 12927/12928 Dadar–Ekta Nagar Superfast Express, also known as Vadodara Express or Night Rider of W.R. as railfans like to call it, is a Superfast train belonging to Indian Railways that runs between  and  in India. It is a daily service. It operates as train number 12927 from Dadar Western to Ekta Nagar and as train number 12928 in the reverse direction. Before being extended to Ekta Nagar, this train regularly ran between Mumbai Central and Vadodara as Vadodara Express.

Coach composition

The train has LHB rakes with max speed of 110 kmph. The train consists of 21 coaches:

 1 AC I Class
 1 AC II Tier
 6 AC III Tier
 8 Sleeper coaches
 4 General Unreserved
 1 EOG cum Luggage Rake

Service

12927/Dadar - Ekta Nagar Superfast Express has an average speed of 69 km/hr and covers 387 km in 5 hrs 36 mins.

12928/Ekta Nagar - Dadar Superfast Express has an average speed of 60 km/hr and covers 387 km in 6 hrs 25 mins.

Route & Halts

The important halts of the train are:

Traction

Both trains are hauled by a Vadodara Loco Shed based WAP-7 locomotive on its entire journey.

Direction reversal

The train reverses its direction 2 times at;
 ,
 .

Rake sharing

The train shares its rake with 12961/12962 Avantika Express.

References 

Transport in Mumbai
Transport in Vadodara
Rail transport in Gujarat
Express trains in India
Named passenger trains of India
Rail transport in Maharashtra
Railway services introduced in 1976